Arquerite is a naturally occurring alloy of silver with mercury. It is a very rare mineral, consisting of a silver-rich variety of amalgam, containing about 87% silver and 13% mercury. Arquerite has been reported from only four localities worldwide, two in Chile and two in British Columbia, Canada. Other names for arquerite include argental mercury, mercurian silver, and silver amalgam.

Localities

Canada
 Vital Creek, Omenica Mining Division, British Columbia, Canada
 Kwanika Creek placers, Kwanika Creek, Omenica Mining Division, British Columbia, Canada

Chile
 La Rosilla mine, Yerbas Buenas, Cerro Blanco district, Copiapó Province, Atacama Region, Chile
Arqueros Ag Mining District, La Serena, Elqui Province, Coquimbo Region, Chile

References 

Silver minerals
Mercury minerals
Native element minerals